Casino Tycoon (賭城大亨之新哥傳奇) is a 1992 Hong Kong action drama film written, produced and directed by Wong Jing starring Andy Lau, Joey Wong and Chingmy Yau. The film is inspired by stories of Stanley Ho, Henry Fok and Yip Hon. It was followed by the sequel Casino Tycoon 2, which was released the same year.

Summary
Set in World War II, Casino Tycoon chronicles the story of Benny, a young graduate played by Andy Lau, who flees Hong-Kong during the Japanese invasion and heads for gambling haven Macau. Once in Macau, he starts as a lowly coolie but he impresses a local business man who has ties to organised crime, and slowly builds his way up  the ranks. Benny engages in a battle of wits against his college rival and business enemies. In the finale, Benny overcomes his enemies but at great personal cost.

Cast and roles
 Andy Lau as Benny Ho San (based on Stanley Ho)
 Joey Wong as Vivian Ching Lok-yee
 Chingmy Yau as Mui (based on Clementina Leitao)
 Alex Man as Kwok Ying-nam (based on Henry Fok)
 Wilson Lam as Fu Ka-chun
 Paul Chun as Wong Cheung
 Kwan Hoi-san as Fu Lo-cha
 Lau Siu-ming as Nip Ngo-tin
 Paw Hee-ching as Benny's mother
 Wong Yat-fei as Dentist Tsang Chi-wai
 Maria Tung Ling as Lucida, half sister of Mui
 Chin Tsi-ang

References

External links
 

Films directed by Wong Jing
1992 films
1990s action drama films
Hong Kong action drama films
Films about gambling
Triad films
1990s Cantonese-language films
Films set in Macau
1992 drama films
1990s Hong Kong films